John Joseph Freeman (November 24, 1918 – May 29, 2003) was an American football coach and college athletic administrator. He served as the head football coach at the College of William & Mary's from 1952 to 1956, compiling a record of 14–29–5. Freeman was also the athletic director at William & Mary from 1952 to 1957.

Freeman played football and basketball and ran track at William & Mary in the 1940s.  He died on May 29, 2003, in Lexington, Virginia.

Head coaching record

College

References

1918 births
2003 deaths
American football halfbacks
American men's basketball players
Notre Dame Fighting Irish football players
People from Somerset County, Pennsylvania
William & Mary Tribe athletic directors
William & Mary Tribe football coaches
William & Mary Tribe football players
William & Mary Tribe men's basketball players
William & Mary Tribe men's track and field athletes
High school football coaches in Pennsylvania
People from Windber, Pennsylvania
Coaches of American football from Pennsylvania
Players of American football from Pennsylvania
Basketball players from Pennsylvania
Track and field athletes from Pennsylvania